Homer Hill Norton (December 30, 1896 – May 26, 1965) was an American football, basketball, and baseball player and coach.  He served as the head football coach at Centenary College of Louisiana from 1919 to 1921 and 1926 to 1933 and at Texas A&M University from 1934 to 1947, compiling a career college football record of 143–75–18. His 1939 Texas A&M team went 11–0, beating Tulane in the Sugar Bowl, and was named a national champion. Norton's record at Texas A&M was 82–53–9, giving him the second most wins of any coach in Texas A&M Aggies football history. He was fired in 1947 when his team went 3–6–1 and lost to Texas for the eighth straight year. Norton was inducted into the College Football Hall of Fame as a coach in 1971.

Norton played four different sports at Birmingham–Southern College and played minor league baseball with the Birmingham Barons prior to becoming a coach. In addition to football, Norton also coached basketball at Centenary from 1921 to 1926 and baseball at Texas A&M from 1943 to 1944.

Norton died of a heart attack on May 26, 1965, in College Station, Texas.

Head coaching record

Football

References

External links
 
 

1896 births
1965 deaths
Birmingham Barons players
Centenary Gentlemen baseball coaches
Centenary Gentlemen basketball coaches
Centenary Gentlemen football coaches
Texas A&M Aggies athletic directors
Texas A&M Aggies baseball coaches
Texas A&M Aggies football coaches
Birmingham–Southern College alumni
College Football Hall of Fame inductees
College men's basketball head coaches in the United States
People from Carrollton, Alabama
Coaches of American football from Alabama
Baseball players from Birmingham, Alabama
Basketball coaches from Alabama